Sean David Runyan (born June 21, 1974) is a former Major League Baseball player.  

After attending Urbandale High School in Urbandale, Iowa, Runyan was drafted by the Houston Astros in the 5th round of the 1992 amateur draft. After several seasons in the minors with the Quad City River Bandits, the Astros traded him to the San Diego Padres in 1997 for Luis Lopez, but was drafted by the Detroit Tigers in the Rule 5 draft that same year.

Runyan's major league debut came on March 31, 1998.  He would be used as a left-handed specialist out of the Tigers bullpen, and would go on to lead the American League in appearances with 88.  The 88 appearances were 2 short of the American League record, but were enough to set the record for rookies.  Runyan was mostly a specialist but did pick up one career save. On July 11, 1998, Runyan pitched 1 1/3 innings to close out a 5-2 Tigers victory over the Blue Jays. He saved the game for starting pitcher Brian Moehler. 

After dealing with arm troubles, Runyan pitched his final game on September 9, 2000.  For his career, he pitched parts of 3 seasons, all in Detroit, and was out of baseball by 2003.

References

External links

Detroit Tigers players
Major League Baseball pitchers
Living people
1974 births
Sportspeople from Fort Smith, Arkansas
People from Urbandale, Iowa
Baseball players from Arkansas
Auburn Astros players
Gulf Coast Astros players
Jacksonville Suns players
Mobile BayBears players
Quad Cities River Bandits players
Rochester Red Wings players
Toledo Mud Hens players